Neblinathamnus is a genus of flowering plants belonging to the family Rubiaceae.

Its native range is Guyana Highlands.

Species
Species:

Neblinathamnus argyreus 
Neblinathamnus brasiliensis

References

Rubiaceae
Rubiaceae genera